Le Havre-Graville is a station serving the Graville-Sainte-Honorine quarter of the city of Le Havre. Services are mainly regional rail. It is situated on the Paris–Le Havre railway and the Lézarde Express Régionale line to Rolleville. It is served by local trains from Le Havre to Montivilliers and Rolleville.

References

Railway stations in Seine-Maritime
Railway stations in France opened in 1847